Feartagar Castle, also called Jennings Castle, is a tower house and National Monument located in County Galway, Ireland.

Location

History
The tower house was built in the 15th–17th century by the de Burgos (Burkes, de Búrca). Descendants of William de Burgh (c. 1160 – 1205/06), Anglo-Norman knight and close friend of King John, the Burkes ruled in Connacht for centuries. They were dispossessed in 1651 by the Cromwellian conquest of Ireland. The castle later came into the possession of the Blakes of Tuam.

Description

A five-storey tower house, 12 × 10 m at base (39 × 33 ft). Features include round bartizans on each corner, a machicolation above the doorway and a latrine chute. The second floor is vaulted and there are two stone staircases.

References

National Monuments in County Galway
Castles in County Galway